Dame Siobhan Roisin Keegan,  is a Northern Irish judge who has been Lord Chief Justice of Northern Ireland since September 2021. She was formerly a judge of the High Court of Northern Ireland from October 2015 until her appointment as Lord Chief Justice, prior to which, she practised as a barrister specialising in family law.

Early life
Keegan was educated at St. Clare's Primary School and Sacred Heart Grammar School, Newry, County Down, Northern Ireland.

She studied law at Queen's University Belfast and graduated with a Bachelor of Laws (LLB) degree in July 1993. After further study, she was called to the Bar of Northern Ireland in September 1994.

Legal career
Keegan became a barrister when she was called to the Bar of Northern Ireland in September 1994. She specialised in family law but has also had experience in criminal law and judicial review.

She was made a Queen's Counsel (QC) in June 2006. Between 2011 and 2013, she served as Chair of the Family Bar Association. In 2014, she was elected Vice Chair of the Bar Council of Northern Ireland.

For each of the financial years from 2013 to 2015, Keegan was the fourth-highest-earning barrister in Northern Ireland in terms of legal aid, having received £504,177 in 2012/2013, £513,405 in 2013/2014, and £427,632 in 2014/2015.

On 23 October 2015, Keegan was appointed a judge of the High Court of Justice in Northern Ireland. She was sworn into office by Sir Declan Morgan, the Lord Chief Justice of Northern Ireland, at the same time as Denise McBride. This made Keegan and McBride jointly the first female high court judges of Northern Ireland.

On 23 November 2015, she was appointed a Dame Commander of the Order of the British Empire (DBE).

On 16 June 2021, Keegan was nominated to be Northern Ireland's first female Lord Chief Justice. She was sworn in as Lord Chief Justice at a ceremony on 2 September 2021.

On 29 September 2021, Keegan became a member of the Privy Council.

References

Living people
High Court judges of Northern Ireland
Alumni of Queen's University Belfast
Women judges from Northern Ireland
Northern Ireland King's Counsel
Dames Commander of the Order of the British Empire
Year of birth missing (living people)
Women lawyers from Northern Ireland